María Trinidad Pérez de Miravete-Mille y Pascual del Riquelme (12 July 1947 – 6 April 2009), better known as Mari Trini, was a Spanish pop singer and actress from Caravaca de la Cruz.

She learned to play guitar as a youngster and wrote songs from an early age. Trini met producer Nicholas Ray in the 1960s, and he encouraged her to move to London; soon after she left for Paris, where she eventually signed to a record label. Her debut album was released in 1969, and through the 1970s and 1980s was a popular figure in Spanish pop music.

Mari Trini died in Murcia in 2009, from lung cancer.

Discography 
1969: Mari Trini  
1970: Amores
1971: Escúchame
1973: Ventanas
1973: L'automne
1974: ¿Quién?
1975: Canta en francés
1975: Transparencias
1976: Como el rocío
1977: El tiempo y yo
1978: Solo para ti
1978: Ayúdala
1979: A mi aire
1981: Oraciones de amor
1982: Una estrella en mi jardín
1984: Mari Trini
1984: Diario de una mujer 
1985: En vivo
1986: Quién me venderá
1987: En tu piel
1990: Espejismos
1993: Sus grandes éxitos
1995: Sin barreras 
1996: Alas de cristal
2001: Mari Trini con los Panchos

References

External links 
 The Guardian: Obituary - Mari Trini
 Europopmusic: Mari Trini
 La página de Mari Trini
 Mari Trini Necrology

1947 births
2009 deaths
Spanish women songwriters
Singers from the Region of Murcia
Spanish women pop singers
20th-century Spanish women singers
Deaths from lung cancer in Spain